The North Devon Gazette is a weekly free newspaper published in Barnstaple, England, on Wednesdays for the North Devon area, including Barnstaple, Bideford, Ilfracombe and South Molton. Since 2008, the newspaper has been available in full, in its published layout, online.

It is owned by Clear Sky Publishing and its sister papers are the Torbay Weekly, and the Moorlander.

References

External links
North Devon Gazette official website

{}

Weekly newspapers published in the United Kingdom
Publications with year of establishment missing
North Devon
Newspapers published in Devon